New College is a coeducational, sixth form college in Pontefract in West Yorkshire, England. It acquired academy status in 2017, forming a trust to open colleges in other areas, called the New Collaborative Learning Trust. At its last Ofsted inspection in 2014, it was rated outstanding.

History
The school on the site was originally built in the Victorian era as a slaughter house before being demolished, later it became the Pontefract Girls' High School, before finally opening as the college in 1987. In 1987 it became north east Wakefield's sixth form college known as NEW college. Previously the Motto of the college was nos excellentia per nostrum discipulus primoris ('We achieve excellence by putting our students first').

The college is now part of an academies trust named the New Collaborative Learning Trust. The CEO, Richard Fletcher, was previously the Principal at the college.

In 2014, colleges in the New Collaborative Learning Trust gave 'academic scholarship' to students to attend their school if they achieved more than 5 A grades at GCSE. They would give £500 to any student that applied for it with these said grades. Fletcher, the then vice principal, said all eligible students would be paid the £500, but 'we wouldn't know how many students would receive this until we opened.' This was labelled 'bribery’ by critics, and not an ‘ethical’ use of public funds, as it was widely reported that New College was the first free school to offer public money in this way.

Academics
In the academic year 2013-14 NEW College Pontefract was Ofsted Outstanding, with inspectors highlighting their heightened success rates, the development of students skills, regular rigorous assessment, and a successful management that create a culture of high expectations. They were encouraged to continue with high standards, and introduce more opportunities to look at the world of work.

In September 2016 a new New College Doncaster was opened by the NCLT with New College Bradford opened in September 2019.

In October 2020 it won the sixth-form college of the year at the Tes FE Awards 2020, achieving top in the country. The college was praised for its 100% pass rate and high grades making up 60% at A-level and 90% in BTEC courses. It was also praised by the judges for its employability training and training for progression to higher education, and its wide range on extracurricular and supercurricular activities.

Notable alumni
Tim Bresnan - England international cricketer.
Tom Briscoe - Rugby league player for Super League side Leeds Rhinos, who graduated in 2008
Rich Johnston - Cartoonist, writer and journalist.
Gill Isles - TV producer.
Ryan Hall - Rugby League player for Super League side Leeds Rhinos
Cameron Smith - Rugby League player for Super League side Leeds Rhinos
Jake Johnson - Gymnast
Danny Kirmond plays rugby league for Wakefield Trinity

References

External links
New College website

1987 establishments in England
Educational institutions established in 1987
Buildings and structures in the City of Wakefield
Sixth form colleges in West Yorkshire
Education in the City of Wakefield
Pontefract